Ella, él y sus millones is a 1944 Spanish  comedy film written and directed by Juan de Orduña.

The movie is based on the play written by Honorio Maura.

External links
 

1944 films
1940s Spanish-language films
Spanish black-and-white films
Spain in fiction
1944 comedy films
Films scored by Juan Quintero Muñoz
Spanish comedy films
1940s Spanish films